Nebria ganglbaueri is a species of ground beetle in the Nebriinae subfamily that can be found in Albanian province of Koritnik, and in every state of former Yugoslavia, except for Croatia and Slovenia.

References

ganglbaueri
Beetles described in 1905
Beetles of Europe